Awkimarka (Quechua awki prince / a mythical figure of the Andean culture / grandfather, marka village, Hispanicized spelling Auquimarca) is an archaeological site in the Apurímac Region in Peru. It is situated in the Apurímac Region, Andahuaylas Province, on the border of the districts of Pomacocha and Tumay Huaraca.

References 

Archaeological sites in Peru
Archaeological sites in Apurímac Region
Mountains of Apurímac Region